Muhammad Saeed  is a Pakistan Army general and the current Chief of General Staff (CGS) at General Headquarters (GHQ). Previously served as corps commander of the V Corps. and the 34 president of the National Defence University from November 2019 to November 2021, his previous staff assignments include director-general of the Inter-Services Intelligence for Analysis branch.

Biography 
Saeed was commissioned in the Pakistan Army on 13 April 1987. He graduated from the National Defence University, Pakistan, and the Command and Staff College. He obtained his master's in science and war studies from Quaid-i-Azam University.

He was initially appointed as commander of an infantry brigade, regiment, and later the general officer commanding (GOC) of an infantry division. In 2016 he was appointed as director-general of the Pakistan Rangers for Sindh unit.

His staff assignments include deputy assistant military secretary (DAMS) and Military Secretary to Chief (MSC) to General Ashfaq Parvez Kyani (Retd), the then Chief of the Army Staff at the GHQ, Rawalpindi.

References 

Living people
Pakistani generals
National Defence University, Pakistan alumni
Graduates of the Staff College, Quetta
People of Inter-Services Intelligence
Recipients of Hilal-i-Imtiaz
Date of birth missing (living people)
Place of birth missing (living people)
Year of birth missing (living people)